Ivelisse is a feminine given name. Notable people with the name include:

Ivelisse Echevarría (born 1956), Puerto Rican softball player
Ivelisse Prats Ramírez (1931–2020), Dominican politician
Ivelisse Vélez (born 1987), Puerto Rican professional wrestler

Feminine given names